Dianna Booher is an American author, and communication expert. She is also the chief executive of Booher Research Institute, a Colleyville, Texas-based company that offers communication consulting, executive coaching (public speaking, executive presence, enterprise-wide communication messaging), and publishing strategies for Fortune 500 organizations and nonprofit organizations.

She is also the founder of Booher Consultants, a communication training firm, that has worked for Fortune 500 organizations and governmental agencies since 1980. Booher Consultants was acquired by Communispond on August 1, 2017.

Early life and education

Dianna Daniels Booher was born in Hillsboro, Texas, as the daughter of a postal supervisor Alton B. and Opal Daniels. She graduated cum laude from North Texas State University in 1970 with a Bachelor of Arts and earned a Master of Arts degree in English literature from University of Houston in 1979. In 1967 she married Daniel T. Booher, a minister of music. They had two children: Jeffrey Thomas and Lisa Christine.

Publications
Booher has written 47 books on business and personal development topics, all published by major U.S. publishers and their various imprints: Simon and Schuster, Penguin Random House, McGraw-Hill, and HarperCollins. Reviewing Your Signature Work, Publishers Weekly criticized its use of a "hackneyed analogy" between life and basketball, but said it offers "good advice".  Fort Worth Star-Telegram called E-Writing "user-friendly" in a favorable review.

Her 2015 book, What More Can I Say? Why Communication Fails and What to Do About It, is discussed in articles in Forbes, FastCompany.com, TLNT.com, and Huffington Post.

Her 2017 book Communicate Like a Leader: Connecting Strategically to Coach, Inspire, and Get Things Done was mentioned favorably in INC, Entrepreneur.com, and Forbes.

Selected bibliography
 Communicate Like a Leader: Connecting Strategically to Coach, Inspire, and Get Things Done (Berrett-Koehler)
 What MORE Can I Say? Why Communication Fails and What to Do About It (Penguin Random House/Perigee)
 Communicate With Confidence: How to Say It Right the First Time and Every Time (Revised and Expanded Edition) (McGraw-Hill)
 Creating Personal Presence: How to Look, Talk, Think, and Act Like a Leader (Berrett-Koehler)
 The Voice of Authority: 10 Communication Strategies Every Leader Needs to Know (McGraw-Hill)
 Booher’s Rules of Business Grammar: 101 Fast and Easy Ways to Correct the Most Common Errors (McGraw-Hill)
 Your Signature Work: Creating Excellence and Influencing Others at Work (Tyndale)
 Speak With Confidence: Powerful Presentations That Inform, Inspire, and Persuade (McGraw-Hill)
 E-Writing: 21st Century Tools for Effective Communication (Simon and Schuster/Pocket Books)

References

External links 
 

Living people
American businesspeople
American self-help writers
University of Houston alumni
People from Hillsboro, Texas
People from Colleyville, Texas
American women non-fiction writers
Year of birth missing (living people)
21st-century American women